"If I Ever Fall in Love Again" is a song written by Steve Dorff and Gloria Sklerov, and performed by Anne Murray and Kenny Rogers as a duet.  The song reached number six on the Canadian Adult Contemporary chart and number nine on the Canadian Country chart in.  It was released in September 1989 as the first single from Murray's compilation album Greatest Hits Volume II and Roger's studio album Something Inside So Strong. The song was produced by Jim Ed Norman and Steve Dorff. In the Philippines, it became a number one hit.

Chart performance

References

1989 singles
Songs written by Steve Dorff
Anne Murray songs
Kenny Rogers songs
Song recordings produced by Jim Ed Norman
Capitol Records Nashville singles
Male–female vocal duets
1989 songs